"Which Face Should I Put On Tonight" is a song recorded by Canadian country music artist Cassandra Vasik. It was released in 1992 as the third single from her debut album, Wildflowers. It peaked at number 5 on the RPM Country Tracks chart in April 1992.

Chart performance

Year-end charts

References

1991 songs
1992 singles
Cassandra Vasik songs
Epic Records singles
Songs written by Tim Thorney
Songs written by Erica Ehm